Tripogon is a genus of tropical and subtropical plants in the grass family. They are widespread across Asia, Africa, Australia, and the Americas. Fiveminute grass is a common name for plants in this genus.

Species
Species include:

Formerly included:
see Indopoa Oropetium 
 Tripogon pauperculus - Indopoa paupercula
 Tripogon roxburghianus - Oropetium roxburghianum

References

Chloridoideae
Poaceae genera